Jonathan David George (born December 10, 1972) is a singer, songwriter and producer. Winning the title Grand Champion  on Ed McMahon’s “Next Big Star”, a sequel to Star Search in 2001 helped launch his musical identity. He went on to serve as creative director of the Hollywood Pop Academy and continued his work in artist development.

George founded JG Entertainment, where he is responsible for developing many young artists.

Early life
Jonathan George was born in Dallas, Texas on December 10, 1972. Growing up in Dallas, Texas as the youngest of 8, George’s musical influences come from his family. Many members of his family play multiple instruments, sings, writes and are pastors of churches. He learned vocals and piano skills from sitting around the piano and guitar with his family, and singing in his father’s Pentecostal church. His grandmother, Dretha Utter, has four successful gospel records. Many of his other relatives have seen success in the Gospel market, giving his family the nickname, “The White Winans”.

Career
In 1991, George received a vocal scholarship to Texas Christian University in Fort Worth, Texas. In 1993 he transferred to the University of Central Oklahoma. In 1996 he graduated with a Bachelor of Vocal Music Education. In 2009, as co-writer (with Sarah Lonsert and Jami Templeton) George was named the grand prize winner for the song "Dancing Through Life" by the USA Songwriting Competition.

References

External links 
JG Entertainment

Living people
American male singer-songwriters
Singer-songwriters from Texas
1972 births
University of Central Oklahoma alumni
21st-century American singers
Musicians from Dallas
21st-century American male singers